Mountain View High School is a public high school outside of Lawrenceville, Georgia, United States. It is a part of Gwinnett County Public Schools. It opened for classes on August 10, 2009.

History
Mountain View was originally created with students from Mill Creek High School, Collins Hill High School, and Dacula High School. It currently serves students from the Mountain View geographic cluster of feeder schools.

The Mountain View school district is made up of J. G. Dyer Elementary, Freeman's Mill Elementary, Woodward Mill Elementary, Patrick Elementary, Twin Rivers Middle School and Mountain View.

Athletics

Rivals
Mountain View's rivals are the Tigers of Archer High School, the Hawks of Mill Creek, and the Falcons of Dacula High School. The Archer rivalry was due to the two schools opening in the same year. However, they did not play in the same region, so they were a non-region fixture for all sports except football, as Archer moved on to the Corky Kell Classic in 2014. The Mill Creek rivalry comes from the 2011 season when the three-year-old Mountain View program upset Mill Creek in a 9-7 football game. On Friday, October 20, 2017, Mountain View beat Mill Creek in the last four seconds of the game with a field goal. The Dacula rivalry stems from a close proximity of the two schools.

Wrestling
The wrestling program at Mountain View has seen success since the programs first start, picking up various team and individual trophies.

References

External links
Mountain View High School
Gwinnett County Public Schools
Mountain View Football
Mountain View Wrestling
Mountain View Athletic Association

Public high schools in Georgia (U.S. state)
Schools in Gwinnett County, Georgia
2009 establishments in Georgia (U.S. state)
Educational institutions established in 2009